Thompson Run is a tributary of the Beaver River in western Pennsylvania.  The stream rises in north-central Beaver County and flows west entering the Beaver River at Homewood, Pennsylvania. The watershed is roughly 12.5% agricultural, 54% forested and the rest is other uses.

See also
List of rivers of Pennsylvania

References

Rivers of Pennsylvania
Tributaries of the Beaver River
Rivers of Beaver County, Pennsylvania
Allegheny Plateau